Short Bend is an unincorporated community in Dent County, in the U.S. state of Missouri.

History
The Short Bend post office closed in 1913. The community was named for a nearby meander on the Meramec River.

References

Unincorporated communities in Dent County, Missouri
Unincorporated communities in Missouri